The women's volleyball tournament at the 1990 Asian Games was held from September 25 to October 5, 1990 in Beijing, China.

Results

|}

Final standing

References
Women's Results

External links
AVC Official website

Women's volleyball